Jeff Woodman is a narrator of audiobooks. He has won 20 Earphone Awards and 1 Audie Award.

Awards and honors

Awards

"Best of" lists 
Reedsy included Jeff Woodman's narration of Daniel Keyes's Flowers for Algernon (1959) in their list of the top 30 science fiction audiobooks.

References 

Living people
Year of birth missing (living people)
21st-century American male actors
American male voice actors
Audiobook narrators